Public Image Ltd are an English post-punk band from London. Formed in 1978, the group originally consisted of vocalist John Lydon, guitarist Keith Levene, bassist Jah Wobble (real name John Wardle) and drummer Jim Walker. The group's current lineup, reformed since 2009, includes Lydon alongside drummer Bruce Smith (originally a member from 1986 to 1990), guitarist Robert "Lu" Edmonds (originally a member from 1986 to 1988) and bassist Scott Firth (a new member since 2009).

History

1978–1981
The first incarnation of Public Image Ltd (PiL) – consisting of John Lydon, Keith Levene, Jah Wobble and Jim Walker – was completed and began rehearsing in May 1978. The band released their debut album Public Image: First Issue before the end of the year, shortly after which Walker left the band due to financial and personal concerns. He was replaced by a succession of drummers: first Vivian Jackson in January 1979, followed by Eddie Edwards and David Humphrey in February, Richard Dudanski in April, Karl Burns in September, and finally Martin Atkins in October. The band's second album Metal Box, released in November, featured performances by Humphrey, Dudanski and Atkins. A year later, the group released their first live album Paris au Printemps, recorded at the beginning of 1980.

By June 1980, Atkins had left PiL to focus on his solo project, Brian Brain. He was followed the next month by Jah Wobble. Later that summer, Lydon and Levene recorded new track "Pied Piper" with brief second guitarist Steve "Shooz" New (later known as Stella Nova), which was released on the Virgin Records sampler Machines. Between October and November, the band recorded their third album The Flowers of Romance, for which Atkins returned in a temporary session performer capacity. PiL played one show around the release of the album, on 15 May 1981 at The Ritz in New York City, with Lydon and Levene joined by drummer Solomon "Sam" Ulano, who was brought in solely for the gig. The performance was cut short due to audience unrest, which then escalated into a riot.

1981–1986
After no activity for the rest of 1981, PiL resurfaced in early 1982 to announce the addition of keyboardist Ken Lockie. By May, the band had been rejoined by former drummer Martin Atkins. In August, Atkins' Brian Brain bandmate Pete Jones joined on bass, which also prompted the departure of Lockie. Recordings from this period, initially intended to make up PiL's fourth album, were independently released by Levene in 1984 as Commercial Zone. After a show in April 1983, Jones left the band. He was quickly replaced by Louis Bernardi. Just a month later, Levene also departed, leaving Lydon as the sole remaining original member. For a Japanese tour starting that month, guitarist Joe Guida and keyboardist Tommy Zvoncheck were brought in.

In September, Zvoncheck was replaced by Arthur Stead, and the group continued touring until the end of the year. During early 1984, Lydon and Atkins (with session contributors) finished working on the band's fourth album, which was released in July as This Is What You Want... This Is What You Get. By the fall, PiL had returned to touring, introducing a new lineup featuring guitarist Mark Schulz, bassist Bret Helm and keyboardist Jebin Bruni. The group toured until January 1985, after which they entered another period of inactivity which included Atkins leaving for a second time that summer. Later in the year, Lydon and the rest of the touring band members began working on a new album with producer Bill Laswell. However, due to the musicians' lack of studio experience, and Laswell's plans, they were replaced with a range of session performers.

1986–1992
After the release of Album in January 1986, a new lineup of PiL was formed with guitarist Kevin Armstrong, guitarist and keyboardist Robert "Lu" Edmonds, bassist Allan Dias, and drummer Bruce Smith; however, when Armstrong pulled out to tour with Iggy Pop, he was replaced with John McGeoch. The new musicians were later made full-time members of the group and recorded Happy? the following year. They continued touring until September 1988, when Edmonds was forced to leave due to hearing problems. After the band released the follow-up album 9 in spring 1989, Ted Chau took over on second guitar and keyboards. By November, he had departed.

In early 1990, Smith also left and the remaining trio recorded "Don't Ask Me" for the compilation The Greatest Hits, So Far. During 1991, the band recorded That What Is Not with two session members: rhythm guitarist Gregg "J.P." Arreguin and drummer Curt "Kirkee B." Bisquera. PiL returned to touring shortly after its release in early 1992, with Ted Chau returning and Mike Joyce joining on drums. During the summer, Dias quit the band suddenly, later recalling that he was "completely burned out" and "had a drug habit". He was replaced for the final run of shows by Russell Webb and the group continued touring until September, after which they went on indefinite hiatus.

Since 2009
In September 2009, it was announced that Lydon would be reforming PiL beginning with a short UK tour in December, with the band completed by former members Lu Edmonds (guitar, keyboards) and drummer Bruce Smith (drums), as well as new member Scott Firth (bass, keyboards). ALiFE 2009, recorded at the reunion shows, was released later. In 2012 the group released their first studio album in 20 years, This Is PiL, which was followed in 2015 by What the World Needs Now...

Members

Current

Former

Touring

Timeline

Lineups

References

External links
Public Image Ltd official website

Public Image Ltd